The Zimbabwe national netball team is the national netball team of Zimbabwe. As of 1 July 2020, Zimbabwe are 12th in the INF World Rankings.

History

Players
The members of the national team are:

The Zimbabwe Netball Association has forwarded its bid to host the regional 2013 Confederation of Southern African Netball Associations tournament.

In 2018 Zimbabwe qualified for their first ever Netball World Cup, qualifying alongside Uganda.

Competitive history

References

National netball teams of Africa
Netball in Zimbabwe
Netball